The Powell Geographic Expedition of 1869, led by American naturalist John Wesley Powell, was the first thorough cartographic and scientific investigation of long segments of the Green and Colorado rivers in the southwestern United States, including the first recorded passage of white men through the entirety of the Grand Canyon. The expedition, which lasted approximately three months during the summer of 1869, embarked from Green River Station, Wyoming Territory and traveled downstream through parts of the present-day states of Colorado and  Utah  before reaching the confluence of the Colorado and Virgin rivers in present-day Arizona and Nevada . Despite a series of hardships, including losses of boats and supplies, near-drownings, and the eventual departures of several crew members, the voyage produced the first detailed descriptions of much of the previously unexplored canyon country of the Colorado Plateau.

Powell retraced part of the 1869 route on a second expedition in the winter of 1871–72. In 1875, he published a classic account of the first expedition (interspersed with elements from the second) called Report on the Exploration of the Colorado River of the West and Its Tributaries, which was revised and reissued in 1895 as The Exploration of the Colorado River and Its Canyons.

Expedition

Members

Journey
Early on the Green River, the Powell Expedition lost one of their large freight boats, the No Name, at a rapids they named Disaster Falls, washing up on Disaster Island. No one was killed, but many crucial supplies were lost, including all of the expedition's barometers. Powell and his men managed to recover some of the barometers - they were the only means Powell had at his disposal to determine altitude. Knowing the altitude was essential for producing good maps, and it allowed Powell to estimate how much vertical drop remained before the journey's endpoint, which had a known elevation. The Powell expedition named many of the landmarks and geological features along the Green and Colorado rivers, including the Flaming Gorge, the Gates of Lodore (in what is now Dinosaur National Monument), and Glen Canyon.

Of the ten men that started out from Green River Station, six completed the entire journey. Frank Goodman left the expedition on July 6 during the resupply at the Uinta River Indian Agency, claiming he'd had more than enough adventure. He walked away and lived for some years with the Paiutes of eastern Utah. Eventually, he settled in Vernal, Utah, where he married and raised a family. The other three adventurers to leave the expedition fared worse. On August 28, just two days from the expedition's intended destination at the mouth of the Virgin River, Oramel Howland, his brother Seneca, and Bill Dunn left the company, fearing they could not survive the dangers of the river much longer. They hiked out of the canyon and were never seen again. Historians still dispute their fate, but it is often proposed that they were killed by local Shivwits Indians in a case of mistaken identity. Another story suggests that they were executed by Mormons who mistook them for U.S. government "spies" investigating the Mountain Meadows Massacre. On August 30, Powell and the five others reached safety at the Mormon settlement of St. Thomas near the mouth of the Virgin River.

Dramatization
The expedition was dramatized in the 1960 Disney film Ten Who Dared and the 2015 play Men on Boats by Jaclyn Backhaus. The graphic novel, "Major Impossible" by author Nathan Hale also dramatizes the expedition.

See also
Sam Adams (explorer)

References

Further reading
 Powell, J. W. (1895). The Exploration of the Colorado River and Its Canyons.

External links
 The American Experience: Lost in the Grand Canyon - Companion site to the PBS series about Jown Wesley Powell's Colorado River journey. It includes a timeline, maps, and program information.
 Stereoviews of Indians and the Colorado River from the J.W. Powell Survey, ca. 1869-1874, The Bancroft Library

Arizona Territory
Utah Territory
Wyoming Territory
American frontier
Exploration of North America
North American expeditions
Expeditions from the United States